Patrick McConnell (5 February 1900 – 14 November 1971) was an Irish footballer who played as an inside forward for Bradford City, Doncaster Rovers, Southport, Shelbourne, Boston United, Spalding United, Grantham Town,  Hibernian and Ireland. In total he scored 30 goals in 201 matches in the Football League. He was both the first player representing both Doncaster and Southport to appear in an international match.

Playing career

Scotland
Paddy began his career in Scottish Junior football playing for Bellshill Athletic and Larkhall Thistle, and with Bathgate in the second tier of the Scottish Football League.

England
McConnell joined Bradford City from Bathgate in August 1924. He made three league appearances for the club. He left the club in May 1925 to play for Doncaster Rovers.

International
He played twice for the all Ireland team, a 2–1 defeat against Wales in 1928 and a 6–2 defeat by England in 1932.

Sources

References

External links

1900 births
1971 deaths
Association footballers from Northern Ireland
Association football inside forwards
Larkhall Thistle F.C. players
Bellshill Athletic F.C. players
Bathgate F.C. players
Bradford City A.F.C. players
Doncaster Rovers F.C. players
Southport F.C. players
Shelbourne F.C. players
Boston United F.C. players
Grantham Town F.C. players
Spalding United F.C. players
Hibernian F.C. players
English Football League players
Scottish Junior Football Association players
Scottish Football League players
League of Ireland players
Pre-1950 IFA international footballers